This is a list of people who coached the Fitzroy Football Club in a senior Australian Football League (AFL) game. Playing the sport of Australian rules football, the Fitzroy Football Club was formed in September 1883, and began playing in the Victorian Football Association (VFA) the following season. Originally based at the Brunswick Street Oval, the club won its first VFA premiership in 1895, but quit the league two years later to join the newly formed Victorian Football League (VFL). Fitzroy won consecutive VFL premierships between 1898 and 1899 and between 1904 and 1905. Prior to the 1911 season, there was no official position of coach. Rather, tactics and positioning were formulating by senior players, including club captains, and selectors. Former player Geoff Moriarty was appointed the club's inaugural coach in 1911, but was replaced by Percy Parratt in 1913, who acted as playing coach. Further premierships were won under Parratt in 1913 and George Holden in 1916, with Vic Belcher captain-coaching the club to the 1922 premiership. Up until the end of the Second World War, the position of coach was almost always filled by the current captain or an ex-Fitzroy player. Frank Maher, an ex- player, coached the club in 1932 and 1933, but was followed by several one-season coaches. Fitzroy were extremely unsuccessful at this point in time, and did not make the finals between 1924 and 1943, when captain Fred Hughson was appointed coach. The club's eighth and last VFL premiership came in 1944, under Hughson. A gradual movement towards non-playing coaches came after the Second World War. Bill Stephen, Fitzroy's longest-serving coach, coached the club on three separate occasions – from 1955 to 1957, 1965 to 1970, and 1979 to 1980 – for a total of 212 games. Fitzroy's last period of success came in the 1980s, with the club making the finals on five separate occasions between 1979 and 1986. The club merged with the Brisbane Bears to form the Brisbane Lions at the conclusion of the 1996 season, having gone through three coaches in its final two seasons, finishing last in each.

Coaches

Key

See also
List of Brisbane Bears coaches

List of Brisbane Lions coaches

References

Fitzroy Football Club coaches

Fitzroy Football Club coaches